is a railway station on the AbukumaExpress in the city of Fukushima, Fukushima Prefecture, Japan.

Lines

Station layout
Oroshimachi Station has one side platform serving a single bi-directional platform. The station is unattended.

Adjacent stations

History
Oroshimachi Station opened on July 1, 1988.

Passenger statistics
In fiscal 2015, the station was used by an average of 333 passengers daily (boarding passengers only).

Surrounding area
Fukushima Central Wholesale Market
 Oroshimachi housing area

See also
 List of Railway Stations in Japan

References

External links

  Abukuma Express home page 

Railway stations in Fukushima Prefecture
Abukuma Express Line
Railway stations in Japan opened in 1988
Fukushima (city)